= Percy Clifton Edwards =

Australian politician

- Born: 1878; Prahran, City of Stonnington, Victoria, Australia
- Died: 22 December 1956; 55 Derby Street, Kew, Victoria, Australia
- Burial place: Boroondara General Cemetery, Victoria, Australia
- Title: Mayor of Kew
- Predecessor: Alan J. McConchie
- Successor: H. Coleman
- Spouse: Bessie Marion
- Children: Hilda Campbell, Roy Edwards, Rene Gray, Les Edwards, Gwen Dickins

Percy Clifton Edwards was an Australian politician. He was the Mayor of Kew between 1928 and 1929. He was also the Councillor of Prospect Ward, a council in the City of Kew in several years.

The earliest he was documented as a Councillor was in a photograph (1922–1924) of several Kew Councillors, including eight who were at some point Mayor of Kew.

In 1924, he stood for Councillor of Prospect Ward, opposed by Michael J. Drohan.

He is known to have been Councillor of Prospect Ward between 1932 and 1934. He was still Councillor in 1936, where he was nominated along with Joseph Thomas Gazzard.

It is likely that he was Councillor of Prospect Ward consistently in the 1920s and 1930s.
